Sepia cottoni is a species of cuttlefish native to the southeastern Indian Ocean, specifically from northwest of Broome (17°31' S) to Armstrong Point, Rottnest Island (32°0' S). It lives at a depth of between 83 and 183 m.

Sepia cottoni grows to a mantle length of 55 mm.

The type specimen was collected west of Lancelin, Australia. It is deposited at the Western Australian Museum in Perth.

References

External links

Cuttlefish
Molluscs described in 1979